The Copa Libertadores 1982 was the 23rd edition of the Copa Libertadores, CONMEBOL's annual international club tournament. Peñarol won the competition.

Group stage

Group 1

Group 2

Group 3

Group 4

Group 5

Semifinals

Group 1

Group 2

Finals

External links
 Sitio oficial de la CONMEBOL
 Libertadores 1982 at RSSSF.com

1
Copa Libertadores seasons